Burhan Abdurahman (1 December 1956 – 4 July 2021) was an Indonesian politician.

Biography
He served as the 2nd Mayor of Ternate from 2010 to 2015 and again from 2016 to 2021. He died in Makassar on 4 July 2021 at the age of 64 from COVID-19.

References

1956 births
2021 deaths
Indonesian politicians
Mayors of places in Indonesia
People from Ternate
Deaths from the COVID-19 pandemic in Indonesia